Lawrence School is an independent, state-chartered private school catering to students with learning differences, such as dyslexia and attention deficit disorder.

Lawrence School was founded in the early 1960s as "Oldman Transitional School", took the name of "dePaul School" in 1982, and finally assumed its present name in 1993 in honor of prominent benefactor Mrs. Lawrence Jontzen.

Facilities and services
Lawrence School has two campus locations. The Lower School campus in Broadview Heights serves students in grades K-6, while the 47-acre Upper School campus in Sagamore Hills Township serves students in grades 7-12. Both locations are central to the greater Cleveland and Akron areas.

Lawrence provides all middle school students with laptops and high school students with tablet computers. The technology program is used in different curricular aspects as well as for providing assistive technological support (such as screen reader software) for students that need it.

Athletics
As a member of the Lake Effect Conference, Lawrence offers 10 varsity sports and four middle school sports.:

Varsity Sports:

Cross Country
Golf
Soccer
Volleyball
Swim
Basketball
Cheer
Softball
Baseball
Esports

Middle School Sports:

Cross Country
Cheer
Basketball
Volleyall

Extracurricular activities
Art Club
Fishing Club
Girls Fitness
Golf Club
Lion's Pride
History Club
Musical
Drama Club
Cooking Club
Art Club
Bowling Club
3D Printer Club
Ski Club

References

External links 
 Lawrence School website

Private high schools in Ohio
Private middle schools in Ohio
Private elementary schools in Ohio
Education in Summit County, Ohio